Daying County is a county of Sichuan province, China, under the administration of Suining City and in the central part of the Sichuan Basin.

Tourist attractions
Daying is the home of the "Chinese Dead Sea", a tourist attraction that is based on a salt lake with nine times the salinity of the ocean and which constitutes the largest indoor water park in China.

A stationary replica of the Titanic is under construction in Daying County as well.

Transportation
The G42 Shanghai–Chengdu Expressway and Dazhou–Chengdu Railway (达成铁路) traverses east–west through the entire length of the county.

The county is served by the Daying East Station (大英东站) on the Suining–Chengdu Railway.

References

External links

County-level divisions of Sichuan